Kaiji: Ultimate Survivor is a Japanese anime television series, based on Gambling Apocalypse: Kaiji, the first part of the manga series Kaiji by Nobuyuki Fukumoto. The story centers on Kaiji Itō, an impoverished young man, and his misadventures around gambling.

The anime was announced by Kodansha's Weekly Young Magazine in 2007. The series was broadcast on Nippon TV from October 3, 2007, and April 2, 2008. Its 26 episodes were collected into nine DVDs, released by VAP between January 23 and September 26, 2008. VAP re-released all the episodes on a DVD box set on October 7, 2009.

In the United States, Kaiji: Ultimate Survivor was streamed on the Joost service in December 2008. In July 2013, Crunchyroll announced the streaming rights to the series. In November 2020, Sentai Filmworks announced that they have licensed the series for streaming on select digital outlets and home video release. It was released in Japanese with English subtitles on Blu-ray Disc on April 20, 2021. An English dub for the first nine episodes premiered on Hidive on November 28, 2022; episodes 10–15 premiered on February 21, 2023.



Episode list

Notes

References

2007 Japanese television seasons
Kaiji (manga)